The Barstow School, previously called Miss Barstow’s School 1884 known as oldest private school for girls in Kansas City, is a secular, coeducational, independent preparatory school in Kansas City, Missouri, USA. It was co-founded in 1884 by Mary Louise Barstow and Ada Brann.

The Barstow School enrolls 750 students from preschool through grade 12.

History 
Mary Louise Barstow and Ada Brann, both graduates of Wellesley College, came to Kansas City in 1884, responding to the need to establish a local school comparable to the outstanding independent schools on the East Coast. With the support of several notable families in the rapidly growing city, they founded the Barstow School at 12th Street and Broadway on Quality Hill in Downtown Kansas City.

As both the school and the city grew and prospered, the school moved several times: first to near Grace and Holy Trinity Cathedral on Quality Hill, then to 40th Street and Westport Avenue, then to 4950 Cherry Street in the Brookside neighborhood, and finally in 1962 to 115th Street and State Line Road, a location then on the far outskirts of the city but today well within Kansas City's suburban sprawl. Although originally coeducational, in 1924 Barstow became an all-girls school except at the preschool level. The school resumed coeducation when it moved to its current location.

In 1960, boys were admitted to the first grade, and Barstow became coeducational one grade and one year at a time, until its first coed graduating class in 1972. Although its class sizes often were under ten, Barstow had two famous alumnae during its early days: movie star Jean Harlow and First Lady Bess Truman.

In 2003, Barstow built a new lower school.

Athletics 

The athletic teams are known as the Barstow Knights, and the school colors are green, black and white.  Starting with the 2010-2011 school year, the head coach for the Knights basketball team is Billy Thomas.

In the fall, teams are girls' tennis, boys' soccer, girls' volleyball, girls' golf, and girls' and boys' cross-country and boys' swimming. The girls' golf team participated in the State Golf Tournament October 18–19, 2010.

Winter sports at Barstow are girls' basketball, boys' basketball, girls' swimming, cheerleading, and the "Knight Starz" (sic) dance team. The Knights cheerleading squad has won the class 2 State Cheerleading Competition twice, in 2005 and 2007.  The Knight Starz dance team took home a 3rd place finish at the 2009 state dance competition.

In the spring, teams are boys' tennis, boys' baseball, girls' soccer, boys' golf, girls' softball, and boys' and girls' track and field.  The boys' baseball team placed second in state in the 2007-2008 season.

In spring 2010, Barstow's Academic Team won the Missouri Class 2 State Championship. All four team members earned All-District Honors and three members earned All-State honors. Also in spring 2010, the varsity girls' soccer team advanced to the Class 1 State Tournament for the first time in school history.

In the spring of 2014, the Barstow boys golf team captured its first Class 2 State Title. The team went back to back by winning again in 2015, with three players earning All-State honors. Head coach Joe Taylor was named Missouri Class 2 Golf Coach of the Year both title winning years. Taylor also currently holds a Class 2 record by attending the state tournament, with team or an individual, every year he has coached the Knights. In 2016, the team extended its five year run as District Champions.

Sports
For boys, Barstow offers: 

For girls, Barstow offers:

Notable alumni

Eldar Djangirov, jazz pianist
Josh Earnest, White House Press Secretary for the Obama Administration, 2014
Jacob Gilyard, basketball player for the Richmond Spiders
Jean Harlow, film actress and top sex symbol of the 1930s, known as the Platinum Blonde
Jessica Krug,  American historian, author, and activist
Brian Loftin, former Major League Soccer Player for the Tampa Bay Mutiny and former commissioner of the Xtreme Soccer League.
Quinton Lucas, University of Kansas law professor who was elected Mayor of Kansas City in 2019.
Michael MacCambridge, author, journalist, TV commentator, and editorial coordinator of the Chiefs’ Hall of Honor.
Jamie Metzl, politician and national security expert
Margot Peet, artist
Marc Solomon, gay rights activist, national director of Freedom to Marry, and author
Bess Truman, wife of Harry S Truman and First Lady of the United States from 1945 to 1953.
Nick Wright, sports personality

References

External links
The Barstow School
Profile from the school's website
Barstow School at the National Center for Education Statistics
Blog post from John Chubb, President of NAIS, after his December '14 visit to the school at the National Association of Independent Schools
2018-2019 Academic Profile

Educational institutions established in 1884
Private K-12 schools in Missouri
Private high schools in Missouri
High schools in Kansas City, Missouri
Private middle schools in Missouri
Private elementary schools in Missouri
1884 establishments in Missouri
History of women in Missouri